Calicut Medical College Stadium (officially Olympian Rahman Stadium) is a football stadium in the city of Kozhikode in Kerala. Council Kozhikode District Sports Council and Kozhikode Corporation had constructed the a  stadium for 35th National Games. The stadium will host football matches along with EMS Stadium.

Location 

Sports Complex is located in the campus of Calicut Medical College which is about 10 km east from the heart of Calicut city. The college is around 10 km east from Calicut Railway station and around 30 kilometers from Calicut International Airport. The college is 5 kilometers from the NH 212 highway.

Facilities 

 Three storied new pavilion with the following facilities Change rooms and toilets for players
 Media work station
 Dope testing rooms
 VIP facilities
 Turfing with Mexican grass
 400 metre synthetic track
 Internal drain, External drain and Peripheral drain

Kerala Blasters FC (B) 

The reserve squad of Kerala Blasters FC, the Kerala Blasters FC (B) use the stadium as their secondary home ground for Kerala Premier League and I-League 2nd Division matches.

References

External links 
 www.calicutmedicalcollege.ac.in

Sports venues in Kerala
Football venues in Kerala
Cricket grounds in Kerala
Sport in Kozhikode
1991 establishments in Kerala
University sports venues in India
Sports venues completed in 1991
20th-century architecture in India